Mexicana Universal Sonora is a pageant in Sonora, Mexico, that selects that state's representative for the national Mexicana Universal.

The State Organization has produced one Nuestra Belleza México in 1999 with Leticia Murray who was appointed at the same time as Nuestra Belleza Internacional México next year and one designated as Nuestra Belleza Mundo México in 2002 with Erika Honstein.

Prior to "Mexicana Universal Sonora" some regional competitions are held within the State as:
Mexicana Universal Agua Prieta
Mexicana Universal Alamos
Mexicana Universal Cajeme
Mexicana Universal Cananea
Mexicana Universal Fronteras
Mexicana Universal Guaymas
Mexicana Universal Huatabampo
Mexicana Universal Navojoa
Mexicana Universal Nogales
Mexicana Universal Puerto Peñasco
Mexicana Universal San Luis Río Colorado
Mexicana Universal Sierra de Sonora

Mexicana Universal Sonora is located at number 4 with four crowns of Nuestra Belleza México.

Titleholders
Below are the names of the annual titleholders of Nuestra Belleza Sonora 1994-2016, Mexicana Universal Sonora 2017, and their final placements in the Mexicana Universal.

 Competed in Miss Universe.
 Competed in Miss World.
 Competed in Miss International.
 Competed in Miss Charm International.
 Competed in Miss Continente Americano.
 Competed in Reina Hispanoamericana.
 Competed in Miss Orb International.
 Competed in Nuestra Latinoamericana Universal.

1 She was selected by The Nuestra Belleza México Organization to represent Mexico in Miss International beauty pageant.

Designated contestants
As of 2000, isn't uncommon for some States to have more than one delegate competing simultaneously in the national pageant. The following Nuestra Belleza Sonora contestants were invited to compete in Nuestra Belleza México. Some have placed higher than the actual State winners.

 Competed in Miss World.

External links
Official Website

Nuestra Belleza México